Our Blessed Aunt (transliterated as Sett al-Settat) is an Egyptian drama film released on June 29, 1998. The film is directed and written by Raafat el-Mehi and stars Laila Elwi, Maged el-Masry, and Magda el-Khatib. The story concerns a young Abdelaziz, who returns to Cairo from another unspecified Arab country. Coming back to his aunt Fakiha's apartment, he discovers that it has become a brothel run by a madam who denies that she is related to him.

Cast
 Laila Elwi (Lola)
 Maged el-Masry (Abdelaziz)
 Hassan Hosny (Hassan el-Demerdash)
 Magda El-Khatib (Basant Abdel-Al/Fakiha al-Sharnoubi/Sitt al-Satat)
 Entessar (Zeinab/Dudu)
 Ali Hassanein (Mamoun Hafez)
 Mukhles al-Buhairi (Major General Azzouz)
 Saeed al-Saleh (Fawzy, a paralegal)
 Ahmed Rizk (Hamada, a soldier)
 Abdulrahim El-Tanir (minister)
 Mohaja Abdelrahman (Sheikha Hosina)
 Diaa Abdel Khalek (taxi driver)
 Nashat Talaat
 Ahmed Saeed
 Najah Fahim
 Iman Wahba
 Youssef Abdelmaqsoud
 Hazem Fouad
 Laila Abdelhakim
 Hazem Mamdouh
 Jihan Wehbe
 Laila Helmy
 Moushira
 Azza Fouad
 Ismat Kamal
 Ahmed Samir
 Rasha Fouad
 Ahmed Bahloul

Synopsis
The comedy's protagonist Abdelaziz (Maged el-Masry) returns to Cairo from working in another unnamed Arab country. Going to the apartment of his aunt Fakiha (Magda el-Khatib), he discovers that it has become a brothel. Lola (Laila Elwi), one of the prostitutes there, tries to convince him to marry her. He has them make the place a pension, but they carry on their old profession anyway. Everyone is arrested, and Abdelaziz discovers a big surprise.

Legacy
Critic Nisreen al-Rashidi cited the film among others on the website 3ain, remarking that:

Egyptian cinema has presented women and dealt with their problems throughout its history, even addressing them by name, sometimes as “mara” [woman] and sometimes as “sitt” [lady]…Here we monitor ten films using the word “sitt” from the earliest days of the silver screen to today.

External links
 El Cinema page
 Dhliz page
 Karohat page

References

Egyptian comedy-drama films
1998 films